Albin Pulkkinen (21 April 1875, Mikkelin maalaiskunta - 29 October 1944) was a Finnish lawyer, civil servant and politician. He was a member of the Parliament of Finland from 1922 to 1924, representing the National Progressive Party. He was the Governor of Mikkeli Province from 1927 to 1933.

References

1875 births
1944 deaths
People from Mikkeli
People from Mikkeli Province (Grand Duchy of Finland)
Finnish Lutherans
National Progressive Party (Finland) politicians
Members of the Parliament of Finland (1922–24)
University of Helsinki alumni